The National Institute of Ophthalmic Sciences is an educational institution affiliated with Tun Hussein Onn National Eye Hospital (THONEH) in Selangor, Malaysia.

History 
The institute was established in 1997 by Tun Hussein Onn National Eye Hospital (THONEH). It consists of the School of Ophthalmic Medical Personnel, the School of Optometry, and the School of Post Graduate Studies and Research. The courses are acceditated by Malaysian Qualifications Agency.

External links

References 

Colleges in Malaysia
Ophthalmology organizations
Universities and colleges in Selangor
Educational institutions established in 1997
1997 establishments in Malaysia